Northeast Investigator Shoal, also known as Dalagang Bukid Shoal; Mandarin ; , also marked as Investigator Northeast Shoal on some nautical charts, is a shoal in the Spratly Islands in the South China Sea.

A small feature with an area of just , the shoal has a few rocks at its western edge that are just visible at high water.

References

Shoals of the Spratly Islands
Reefs of China
Reefs of the Philippines
Reefs of Taiwan
Reefs of Vietnam
Disputed reefs